Worldwide it was estimated that 1.25 million people were killed and many millions more were injured in motor vehicle collisions in 2013. This makes motor vehicle collisions the leading cause of death among young adults of 15–29 years of age (360,000 die a year) and the ninth cause of death for all ages worldwide. In the United States, 40,100 people died and 2.8 million were injured in crashes in 2017, and around 2,000 children under 16 years old die every year.

History and trends

Road toll figures in developed nations show that car collision fatalities have declined since 1980. Japan is an extreme example, with road deaths decreasing to 5,115 in 2008, which is 25% of the 1970 rate per capita and 17% of the 1970 rate per vehicle distance travelled. In 2008, for the first time, more pedestrians than vehicle occupants were killed in Japan by cars. Besides improving general road conditions like lighting and separated walkways, Japan has been installing intelligent transportation system technology such as stalled-car monitors to avoid crashes.

In developing nations, statistics may be grossly inaccurate or hard to get. Some nations have not significantly reduced the total death rate, which stands at 12,000 in Thailand in 2007, for example.

In the United States, twenty-eight states had reductions in the number of automobile crash fatalities between 2005 and 2006. 55% of vehicle occupants 16 years or older in 2006 were not using seat belts when they crashed.

Road fatality trends tend to follow Smeed's law, an empirical schema that correlates increased fatality rates per capita with traffic congestion.

Deaths in 2005

Crashes are categorized by what is struck and the direction of impact, or impacts. These are some common crash types, based on the total number that occurred in the US in 2005, the percentage of total crashes, and the percentage of fatal crashes:

 Rear impacts (1,824,000 crashes, 29.6% of all US crashes, 5.4% of US fatal crashes)
 Angle or side impacts (1,779,000 crashes, 28.9% of all US crashes, 20.7% of US fatal crashes)
 Run-off-road collisions (992,000 crashes, 16.1% of US crashes, 31.7% of US fatal crashes)
 Collisions with animals (275,000 crashes, 4.5% of US crashes, 0.4% of fatal crashes)
 Rollovers (141,000 crashes, 2.3% of all US crashes, 10.9% of US fatal crashes)
 Head-on collision (123,000 crashes, only 2.0% of all US crashes, but 10.1% of US fatal crashes)
 Collisions with pedestrians and bicyclists (114,000 crashes, only 1.8% of US crashes, but 13.5% of US fatal crashes)
 Back-up collisions killed 221 people in the US in 2007, and injured about 14,400. This is one of the most common types of non-traffic auto collision in which road workers and children 15 and younger are killed.

Rollover, head-on, pedestrian, and bicyclist crashes combined are only 6.1% of all crashes, but cause 34.5% of traffic-related fatalities.

Sometimes the vehicles in the collision can suffer more than one type of impact, such as during a shunt or high-speed spin. This is called a "second harmful event," such as when a vehicle is redirected by the first crash into another vehicle or fixed object.

Representation of regional death statistics on map reveals significant differences even between neighboring regions.

Source IRTAD for the following data:
 Number of vehicles: 2005 except Ireland 2003; Luxembourg 2004; Slovakia 2002.
 Length of the network: 2005 except Hungary and Luxembourg 2004; Germany and Denmark 2003; Slovakia 2002; Iceland 2000; Ireland 2001; Netherlands 1999; Greece and United Kingdom 1998; Portugal 1993; Italy 1992.
 Distance in Kilometres: 2005 except Denmark 2004; Italy and Netherlands 2003; Ireland 2001; Iceland and Slovakia 2000; United Kingdom and Greece 1998.
 Population: source IRTAD except for Ireland, Luxembourg, Slovakia, Sweden, Iceland and Norway: source INED.

Deaths

Deaths per passenger-kilometer
The 28 EU-28 countries, for the 28 members, computed an indicator named "per 10 billion pkm".
Pkm is an indicator of traffic volume which is used for not having consistent vehicle-kilometre data. Are counted cars and estimated motorised two-wheelers. In 2016, this indicator ranges from 23 for Sweden to 192 for Romania, with a value of 52 for the EU-28.  In Germany, France, the UK and Italy, this score is respectively 33, 46, 28, 44.

Deaths in Europe
In 2019, the 27 members states of the European Union had 51 road deaths per million inhabitants. Because the UK had less fatalities than the average EU and due to Brexit; this rate raised to 51. Including the UK, the rate of the 28 would have been 48.

The safest of those 28 nations was Sweden (22 deaths/million inhabitants) while Romania reported the highest fatality rates of the EU in 2019. (96/million).

Deaths in United States of America
In 2019, the NHTSA counted 36,096 fatalities in motor vehicle traffic crashes; that is 1.10 fatalities per 100 million vehicle miles traveled.

See also 
Road-traffic safety
Management systems for road safety
Smeed's law

Nations:
List of motor vehicle deaths in Australia by year
List of motor vehicle deaths in Japan by year
List of motor vehicle deaths in Thailand by year
List of motor vehicle deaths in U.S. by year and Transportation safety in the United States

Notes

References

 
 Fey A, ;Becker IV, ;Furlani LF, ;Teixeira JVC, ;Bahter LCV, ;Teixeira JVC. "Perfil epidemiológico dos óbitos em accidentes de trânsito na região do Alto Vale do Itajaí, Santa Catarina, Brasil." ["Epidemiological profile of deaths in traffic accidents in the Region Alto Vale do Itajaí, Santa Catarina, Brazil"]. Revista On-line da Associação Catarinense de Medicina. 2011; V40 N1: 23–27.
 Fey A, ;Enge Junior DJ, ;Becker IV, ;Teixeira JVC, ;Teixeira JVC. ; Perfil dos accidentes de trânsito com vítimas fatais do Alto Vale do Itajaí segundo dados dos boletins policiais de ocorrência da polícia rodoviária federal– BR 470, estadual e perímetro urbano de Rio do Sul no período de 2004 a 2006. Revista On-line da Associação Catarinense de Medicina. 2012; V41 N3: 20–25.

Automotive safety
Traffic collisions
Motor Vehicle Collisions
Causes of death